Stenoptilia balsami is a moth of the family Pterophoridae. It is known from Yemen.

References

balsami
Insects of the Arabian Peninsula
Moths described in 2010
Moths of Asia